A list of American films released in 1949. 
All the King's Men won the Academy Award for Best Picture.

A-B

C-D

E-H

I-J

K-L

M-N

O-R

S-T

U-Z

Serials

Shorts

See also
 1949 in the United States

References

External links

1949 films at the Internet Movie Database

1949
Films
Lists of 1949 films by country or language